Qualification for tennis at the 2012 Summer Olympics in London, United Kingdom, was determined not by any form of qualifying tournament, but by the rankings maintained by the Association of Tennis Professionals (ATP) and the Women's Tennis Association (WTA).

Qualifying criteria
The main qualifying criteria were the ATP and WTA ranking lists as of 11 June 2012. The players entering were formally submitted by the International Tennis Federation. The ATP and WTA rankings were based on performances from the previous 52 weeks, and there were several tournaments in the two-month period between the time of the rankings being frozen for entry and the beginning of the tennis events at the Olympics. Players must have also made themselves available for two Fed/Davis Cup events from 2009–2012, one of which must have taken place in 2011–2012, and had a good standing with their National Olympic Committee.

Each National Olympic Committee (NOC) could enter up to six men and six women athletes, with a maximum of four entries in the individual events, and two pairs in the doubles events. Any player in the world's top 56 was eligible, and NOCs had the option to enter players of a lower rank. Athletes were able to compete in both singles and doubles events. Doubles players within the top 10 doubles rankings on 11 June were eligible to bring any player provided that player had any doubles or singles ranking, and as long as the number of players from the same country did not surpass the total of six.

Qualifiers

The Entry List was released on 26 June 2012, based on the rankings as at 11 June.

Men's singles

Women's singles
 

† Romina Oprandi has previously represented Italy, making her ineligible for Switzerland.

PR Protected/Special Ranking
Rankings as at 11 June 2012
 * by Tripartite Commission Invitation, their rankings as of 11 June 2012

Men's doubles

' Players higher ranking is singles
^ Players have also qualified to the singles tournament

Women's doubles

' Players higher ranking is singles
^ Players have also qualified to the singles tournament

Mixed doubles
The Entry List was released on 31 July 2012, based on the rankings as at 11 June.

Summary
Numbers represent the current conditions (27 July 2012)

Number in brackets = players participating only in doubles

Notes

References

External links
 Tennis London 2012 official website
 Official Davis Cup website
 Official Fed Cup website
 London 2012 official website 

Qualification for the 2012 Summer Olympics
Tennis at the 2012 Summer Olympics
Qualification for tennis tournaments